The 72nd United States Congress was a meeting of the legislative branch of the United States federal government, consisting of the United States Senate and the United States House of Representatives. It met in Washington, D.C. from March 4, 1931, to March 4, 1933, during the last two years of Herbert Hoover's presidency. The apportionment of seats in this House of Representatives was based on the 1910 United States census. The Senate had a Republican majority.  The House started with a very slim Republican majority, but by the time it first met in December 1931, the Democrats had gained a majority through special elections.

Major events 

 Ongoing: Great Depression
 January 12, 1932: Hattie Wyatt Caraway of Arkansas became the first woman elected to the United States Senate. (Rebecca Latimer Felton of Georgia had been appointed to fill a vacancy in 1922; the 87-year-old Felton served one day as a senator.) Caraway had won a special election to fill the remaining months of the term of her late husband, Senator Thaddeus Caraway. She won re-election to a full term in 1932 and again in 1938 and served in the Senate until January 1945.
 July 28, 1932: Bonus Army was dispersed.
 November 8, 1932: United States elections, 1932:
 1932 United States presidential election: Incumbent Republicans Herbert Hoover and Charles Curtis lost to Democrats Franklin Roosevelt as President, and John Nance Garner as Vice President.
 United States Senate elections, 1932: Democrats gained 12 seats for a 59–36 majority.
 United States House of Representatives elections, 1932: Democrats gained 97 seats for a 313–117 majority.

Major legislation 

January 22, 1932: Reconstruction Finance Corporation Act, Sess. 1, ch. 8, 
February 27, 1932: Glass-Steagall Act of 1932, Sess. 1, ch. 58, 
March 23, 1932: Norris-LaGuardia Act, Sess. 1, ch. 90, 
June 6, 1932: Revenue Act of 1932, Sess. 1, ch. 209, 
June 22, 1932: Federal Kidnapping Act, Sess. 1, ch. 271, 
June 30, 1932: Economy Act of 1932, Sess. 1, ch. 314, 
July 21, 1932: Emergency Relief and Construction Act, Sess. 1, ch. 520, 
July 22, 1932: Federal Home Loan Bank Act, Sess. 1, ch. 522, 
January 17, 1933: Hare-Hawes-Cutting Act, Sess. 2, ch. 11, 
March 3, 1933: Buy American Act, Sess. 2, ch. 212, title III,

Constitutional amendments 
 March 2, 1932: Approved an amendment to the United States Constitution moving the beginning and ending of the terms of the president and vice president from March 4 to January 20, and of members of Congress from March 4 to January 3, and also establishing what is to be done when there is no president-elect, and submitted it to the state legislatures for ratification
 January 23, 1933: The Twentieth Amendment to the United States Constitution was ratified by the requisite number of states (then 36) to become part of the Constitution.
 February 20, 1933: Approved an amendment to the U.S. Constitution repealing the Eighteenth Amendment, and submitted it to state ratifying conventions for ratification
 Amendment was later ratified on December 5, 1933, becoming the Twenty-first Amendment to the United States Constitution

Party summary 
The count below identifies party affiliations at the beginning of the first session of this Congress, and includes members from vacancies and newly admitted states, when they were first seated. Changes resulting from subsequent replacements are shown below in the "Changes in membership" section.

Senate

House of Representatives

Leadership

Senate 
President: Charles Curtis (R)
President pro tempore: George H. Moses (R)

Majority (Republican) 
Majority Leader: James E. Watson
Majority Whip: Simeon D. Fess
 Republican Conference Secretary:  Frederick Hale
 National Senatorial Committee Chair: Daniel O. Hastings

Minority (Democratic) 
Minority Leader: Joseph T. Robinson
Minority Whip: Morris Sheppard
 Democratic Caucus Secretary: Hugo Black

House of Representatives 

 Speaker: John N. Garner (D)

Note: Republican Nicholas Longworth, the Speaker of the House in the previous Congress, was  Speaker-presumptive with his party's mere three-seat majority. However, Longworth died on April 9, 1931, and by the time the 72nd Congress convened in December 1931, Democrats had gained four seats from Republicans through special elections following deaths, thus becoming the majority party in the House. Democrat John Garner was subsequently elected as Speaker.

Majority (Democratic) 
 Majority Leader: Henry T. Rainey
 Majority Whip: John McDuffie
 Democratic Caucus Chairman: William W. Arnold
 Democratic Campaign Committee Chairman: Joseph W. Byrns Sr.

Minority (Republican) 
 Minority Leader: Bertrand H. Snell
 Minority Whip: Carl G. Bachmann
 Republican Conference Chairman: Willis C. Hawley
 Republican Campaign Committee Chairman: William R. Wood

Members 
This list is arranged by chamber, then by state. Senators are listed by class, and representatives are listed by district.

Senate 
Senators were elected every two years, with one-third beginning new six-year terms with each Congress. Preceding the names in the list below are Senate class numbers, which indicate the cycle of their election. In this Congress, Class 1 meant their term began in the last Congress, requiring reelection in 1934; Class 2 meant their term began with this Congress, requiring reelection in 1936; and Class 3 meant their term ended with this Congress, requiring reelection in 1932.

Alabama 
 2. John H. Bankhead II (D)
 3. Hugo Black (D)

Arizona 
 1. Henry F. Ashurst (D)
 3. Carl Hayden (D)

Arkansas 
 2. Joseph T. Robinson (D)
 3. Thaddeus H. Caraway (D), until November 6, 1931
 Hattie Caraway (D), from November 13, 1931

California 
 1. Hiram Johnson (R)
 3. Samuel M. Shortridge (R)

Colorado 
 2. Edward P. Costigan (D)
 3. Charles W. Waterman (R), until August 27, 1932
 Walter Walker (D), September 16, 1932 – December 6, 1932
 Karl C. Schuyler (R), from December 7, 1932

Connecticut 
 1. Frederic C. Walcott (R)
 3. Hiram Bingham III (R)

Delaware 
 1. John G. Townsend Jr. (R)
 2. Daniel O. Hastings (R)

Florida 
 1. Park Trammell (D)
 3. Duncan U. Fletcher (D)

Georgia 
 2. William J. Harris (D), until April 18, 1932
 John S. Cohen (D), April 25, 1932 – January 11, 1933
 Richard Russell Jr. (D), from January 12, 1933
 3. Walter F. George (D)

Idaho 
 2. William E. Borah (R)
 3. John W. Thomas (R)

Illinois 
 2. J. Hamilton Lewis (D)
 3. Otis F. Glenn (R)

Indiana 
 1. Arthur R. Robinson (R)
 3. James E. Watson (R)

Iowa 
 2. Lester J. Dickinson (R)
 3. Smith W. Brookhart (R)

Kansas 
 2. Arthur Capper (R)
 3. George McGill (D)

Kentucky 
 2. Marvel M. Logan (D)
 3. Alben W. Barkley (D)

Louisiana 
 2. Huey Long (D), from January 25, 1932
 3. Edwin S. Broussard (D)

Maine 
 1. Frederick Hale (R)
 2. Wallace H. White Jr. (R)

Maryland 
 1. Phillips Lee Goldsborough (R)
 3. Millard Tydings (D)

Massachusetts 
 1. David I. Walsh (D)
 2. Marcus A. Coolidge (D)

Michigan 
 1. Arthur H. Vandenberg (R)
 2. James J. Couzens (R)

Minnesota 
 1. Henrik Shipstead (FL)
 2. Thomas D. Schall (R)

Mississippi 
 1. Hubert D. Stephens (D)
 2. Pat Harrison (D)

Missouri 
 1. Roscoe C. Patterson (R)
 3. Harry B. Hawes (D), until February 3, 1933
 Bennett Champ Clark (D), from February 3, 1933

Montana 
 1. Burton K. Wheeler (D)
 2. Thomas J. Walsh (D), until March 2, 1933

Nebraska 
 1. Robert B. Howell (R)
 2. George W. Norris (R)

Nevada 
 1. Key Pittman (D)
 3. Tasker Oddie (R)

New Hampshire 
 2. Henry W. Keyes (R)
 3. George H. Moses (R)

New Jersey 
 1. Hamilton F. Kean (R)
 2. Dwight Morrow (R), until October 5, 1931
 W. Warren Barbour (R), from December 1, 1931

New Mexico 
 1. Bronson M. Cutting (R)
 2. Sam G. Bratton (D)

New York 
 1. Royal S. Copeland (D)
 3. Robert F. Wagner (D)

North Carolina 
 2. Josiah W. Bailey (D)
 3. Cameron A. Morrison (D), until December 4, 1932
 Robert R. Reynolds (D), from December 5, 1932

North Dakota 
 1. Lynn Frazier (R-NPL)
 3. Gerald Nye (R)

Ohio 
 1. Simeon D. Fess (R)
 3. Robert J. Bulkley (D)

Oklahoma 
 2. Thomas Gore (D)
 3. Elmer Thomas (D)

Oregon 
 2. Charles L. McNary (R)
 3. Frederick Steiwer (R)

Pennsylvania 
 1. David A. Reed (R)
 3. James J. Davis (R)

Rhode Island 
 1. Felix Hebert (R)
 2. Jesse H. Metcalf (R)

South Carolina 
 2. James F. Byrnes (D)
 3. Ellison D. Smith (D)

South Dakota 
 2. William J. Bulow (D)
 3. Peter Norbeck (R)

Tennessee 
 1. Kenneth McKellar (D)
 2. Cordell Hull (D)

Texas 
 1. Tom Connally (D)
 2. Morris Sheppard (D)

Utah 
 1. William H. King (D)
 3. Reed Smoot (R)

Vermont 
 1. Porter H. Dale (R)
 3. Frank C. Partridge (R), until March 31, 1931
 Warren Austin (R), from April 1, 1931

Virginia 
 1. Claude A. Swanson (D)
 2. Carter Glass (D)

Washington 
 1. Clarence Dill (D)
 3. Wesley L. Jones (R), until November 19, 1932
 Elijah S. Grammer (R), from November 22, 1932

West Virginia 
 1. Henry D. Hatfield (R)
 2. Matthew M. Neely (D)

Wisconsin 
 1. Robert M. La Follette Jr. (R)
 3. John J. Blaine (R)

Wyoming 
 1. John B. Kendrick (D)
 2. Robert D. Carey (R)

House of Representatives 
The names of members of the House of Representatives elected statewide on the general ticket or otherwise at-large, are preceded by an "At-large," and the names of those elected from districts, whether plural or single member, are preceded by their district numbers.

Alabama 
 . John McDuffie (D)
 . J. Lister Hill (D)
 . Henry B. Steagall (D)
 . Lamar Jeffers (D)
 . LaFayette L. Patterson (D)
 . William B. Oliver (D)
 . Miles C. Allgood (D)
 . Edward B. Almon (D)
 . George Huddleston (D)
 . William B. Bankhead (D)

Arizona 
 . Lewis W. Douglas (D)

Arkansas 
 . William J. Driver (D)
 . John E. Miller (D)
 . Claude A. Fuller (D)
 . Effiegene L. Wingo (D)
 . Heartsill Ragon (D)
 . David D. Glover (D)
 . Tilman B. Parks (D)

California 
 . Clarence F. Lea (D)
 . Harry L. Englebright (R)
 . Charles F. Curry Jr. (R)
 . Florence P. Kahn (R)
 . Richard J. Welch (R)
 . Albert E. Carter (R)
 . Henry E. Barbour (R)
 . Arthur M. Free (R)
 . William E. Evans (R)
 . Joe Crail (R)
 . Phil Swing (R)

Colorado 
 . William R. Eaton (R)
 . Charles B. Timberlake (R)
 . Guy U. Hardy (R)
 . Edward T. Taylor (D)

Connecticut 
 . Augustine Lonergan (D)
 . Richard P. Freeman (R)
 . John Q. Tilson (R), until December 3, 1932
 . William L. Tierney (D)
 . Edward W. Goss (R)

Delaware 
 . Robert G. Houston (R)

Florida 
 . Herbert J. Drane (D)
 . Robert A. Green (D)
 . Tom A. Yon (D)
 . Ruth Bryan Owen (D)

Georgia 
 . Charles G. Edwards (D), until July 13, 1931
 Homer C. Parker (D), from September 9, 1931
 . Edward E. Cox (D)
 . Charles R. Crisp (D), until October 7, 1932
 Bryant T. Castellow (D), from November 8, 1932
 . William C. Wright (D)
 . Robert Ramspeck (D)
 . Samuel Rutherford (D), until February 4, 1932
 Carlton Mobley (D), from March 2, 1932
 . Malcolm C. Tarver (D)
 . Charles H. Brand (D)
 . John S. Wood (D)
 . Carl Vinson (D)
 . William C. Lankford (D)
 . William W. Larsen (D)

Idaho 
 . Burton L. French (R)
 . Addison T. Smith (R)

Illinois 
 . Oscar S. De Priest (R)
 . Morton D. Hull (R)
 . Edward A. Kelly (D)
 . Harry P. Beam (D)
 . Adolph J. Sabath (D)
 . James T. Igoe (D)
 . Leonard W. Schuetz (D)
 . Peter C. Granata (R), until April 5, 1932
 Stanley H. Kunz (D), from April 5, 1932
 . Frederick A. Britten (R)
 . Carl R. Chindblom (R)
 . Frank R. Reid (R)
 . John T. Buckbee (R)
 . William R. Johnson (R)
 . John C. Allen (R)
 . Burnett M. Chiperfield (R)
 . William E. Hull (R)
 . Homer W. Hall (R)
 . William P. Holaday (R)
 . Charles Adkins (R)
 . Henry T. Rainey (D)
 . J. Earl Major (D)
 . Charles A. Karch (D), until November 6, 1932
 . William W. Arnold (D)
 . Claude V. Parsons (D)
 . Kent E. Keller (D)
 . William H. Dieterich (D)
 . Richard Yates (R)

Indiana 
 . John W. Boehne Jr. (D)
 . Arthur H. Greenwood (D)
 . Eugene B. Crowe (D)
 . Harry C. Canfield (D)
 . Courtland C. Gillen (D)
 . William H. Larrabee (D)
 . Louis Ludlow (D)
 . Albert H. Vestal (R), until April 1, 1932
 . Fred S. Purnell (R)
 . William R. Wood (R)
 . Glenn Griswold (D)
 . David Hogg (R)
 . Samuel B. Pettengill (D)

Iowa 
 . William F. Kopp (R)
 . Bernhard M. Jacobsen (D)
 . Thomas J. B. Robinson (R)
 . Gilbert N. Haugen (R)
 . Cyrenus Cole (R)
 . C. William Ramseyer (R)
 . Cassius C. Dowell (R)
 . Lloyd Thurston (R)
 . Charles E. Swanson (R)
 . Fred C. Gilchrist (R)
 . Ed H. Campbell (R)

Kansas 
 . William P. Lambertson (R)
 . Ulysses S. Guyer (R)
 . Harold C. McGugin (R)
 . Homer Hoch (R)
 . James G. Strong (R)
 . Charles I. Sparks (R)
 . Clifford R. Hope (R)
 . William A. Ayres (D)

Kentucky 
 . William V. Gregory (D)
 . Glover H. Cary (D)
 . John W. Moore (D)
 . Cap R. Carden (D)
 . Maurice H. Thatcher (R)
 . Brent Spence (D)
 . Virgil Chapman (D)
 . Ralph W. E. Gilbert (D)
 . Fred M. Vinson (D)
 . Andrew J. May (D)
 . Charles Finley (R)

Louisiana 
 . Joachim O. Fernández (D)
 . Paul H. Maloney (D)
 . Numa F. Montet (D)
 . John N. Sandlin (D)
 . Riley J. Wilson (D)
 . Bolivar E. Kemp (D)
 . René L. De Rouen (D)
 . James B. Aswell (D), until March 16, 1931
 John H. Overton (D), from May 12, 1931

Maine 
 . Carroll L. Beedy (R)
 . Donald B. Partridge (R)
 . John E. Nelson (R)
 . Donald F. Snow (R)

Maryland 
 . T. Alan Goldsborough (D)
 . William P. Cole Jr. (D)
 . Vincent L. Palmisano (D)
 . J. Charles Linthicum (D), until October 5, 1932
 Ambrose J. Kennedy (D), from November 8, 1932
 . Stephen W. Gambrill (D)
 . David J. Lewis (D)

Massachusetts 
 . Allen T. Treadway (R)
 . William J. Granfield (D)
 . Frank H. Foss (R)
 . Pehr G. Holmes (R)
 . Edith Nourse Rogers (R)
 . Abram Andrew (R)
 . William P. Connery Jr. (D)
 . Frederick W. Dallinger (R), until October 1, 1932
 . Charles L. Underhill (R)
 . John J. Douglass (D)
 . George H. Tinkham (R)
 . John W. McCormack (D)
 . Robert Luce (R)
 . Richard B. Wigglesworth (R)
 . Joseph W. Martin Jr. (R)
 . Charles L. Gifford (R)

Michigan 
 . Robert H. Clancy (R)
 . Earl C. Michener (R)
 . Joseph L. Hooper (R)
 . John C. Ketcham (R)
 . Carl E. Mapes (R)
 . Seymour H. Person (R)
 . Jesse P. Wolcott (R)
 . Bird J. Vincent (R), until July 18, 1931
 Michael J. Hart (D), from November 3, 1931
 . James C. McLaughlin (R), until November 29, 1932
 . Roy O. Woodruff (R)
 . Frank P. Bohn (R)
 . W. Frank James (R)
 . Clarence J. McLeod (R)

Minnesota 
 . Victor Christgau (R)
 . Frank Clague (R)
 . August H. Andresen (R)
 . Melvin Maas (R)
 . William I. Nolan (R)
 . Harold Knutson (R)
 . Paul J. Kvale (FL)
 . William Pittenger (R)
 . Conrad Selvig (R)
 . Godfrey G. Goodwin (R), until February 16, 1933

Mississippi 
 . John E. Rankin (D)
 . Wall Doxey (D)
 . William M. Whittington (D)
 . T. Jeff Busby (D)
 . Ross A. Collins (D)
 . Robert S. Hall (D)
 . Percy Quin (D), until February 4, 1932
 Lawrence R. Ellzey (D), from March 15, 1932
 . James Collier (D)

Missouri 
 . Milton A. Romjue (D)
 . Ralph F. Lozier (D)
 . Jacob L. Milligan (D)
 . David W. Hopkins (R)
 . Joe Shannon (D)
 . Clement C. Dickinson (D)
 . Samuel C. Major (D), until July 28, 1931
 Robert D. Johnson (D), from September 29, 1931
 . William L. Nelson (D)
 . Clarence Cannon (D)
 . Henry F. Niedringhaus (R)
 . John J. Cochran (D)
 . Leonidas C. Dyer (R)
 . Clyde Williams (D)
 . James F. Fulbright (D)
 . Joe J. Manlove (R)
 . William E. Barton (D)

Montana 
 . John M. Evans (D)
 . Scott Leavitt (R)

Nebraska 
 . John H. Morehead (D)
 . Howard M. Baldrige (R)
 . Edgar Howard (D)
 . John N. Norton (D)
 . Ashton C. Shallenberger (D)
 . Robert G. Simmons (R)

Nevada 
 . Samuel S. Arentz (R)

New Hampshire 
 . Fletcher Hale (R), until October 22, 1931
 William N. Rogers (D), from January 5, 1932
 . Edward H. Wason (R)

New Jersey 
 . Charles A. Wolverton (R)
 . Isaac Bacharach (R)
 . William H. Sutphin (D)
 . Charles A. Eaton (R)
 . Ernest R. Ackerman (R), until October 18, 1931
 Percy H. Stewart (D), from December 1, 1931
 . Randolph Perkins (R)
 . George N. Seger (R)
 . Fred A. Hartley Jr. (R)
 . Peter A. Cavicchia (R)
 . Frederick R. Lehlbach (R)
 . Oscar L. Auf der Heide (D)
 . Mary T. Norton (D)

New Mexico 
 . Dennis Chavez (D)

New York 
 . Robert L. Bacon (R)
 . William F. Brunner (D)
 . George W. Lindsay (D)
 . Thomas H. Cullen (D)
 . Loring M. Black Jr. (D)
 . Andrew L. Somers (D)
 . Matthew V. O'Malley (D), until May 26, 1931
  John J. Delaney (D), from November 3, 1931
 . Patrick J. Carley (D)
 . Stephen A. Rudd (D)
 . Emanuel Celler (D)
 . Anning S. Prall (D)
 . Samuel Dickstein (D)
 . Christopher D. Sullivan (D)
 . William I. Sirovich (D)
 . John J. Boylan (D)
 . John J. O'Connor (D)
 . Ruth Baker Pratt (R)
 . Martin J. Kennedy (D)
 . Sol Bloom (D)
 . Fiorello H. LaGuardia (R)
 . Joseph A. Gavagan (D)
 . Anthony J. Griffin (D)
 . Frank A. Oliver (D)
 . James M. Fitzpatrick (D)
 . Charles D. Millard (R)
 . Hamilton Fish Jr. (R)
 . Harcourt J. Pratt (R)
 . Parker Corning (D)
 . James S. Parker (R)
 . Frank Crowther (R)
 . Bertrand Snell (R)
 . Francis D. Culkin (R)
 . Frederick M. Davenport (R)
 . John D. Clarke (R)
 . Clarence E. Hancock (R)
 . John Taber (R)
 . Gale H. Stalker (R)
 . James L. Whitley (R)
 . Archie D. Sanders (R)
 . Walter G. Andrews (R)
 . Edmund F. Cooke (R)
 . James M. Mead (D)
 . Daniel A. Reed (R)

North Carolina 
 . Lindsay C. Warren (D)
 . John H. Kerr (D)
 . Charles L. Abernethy (D)
 . Edward W. Pou (D)
 . Franklin W. Hancock Jr. (D)
 . J. Bayard Clark (D)
 . J. Walter Lambeth (D)
 . Robert L. Doughton (D)
 . Alfred L. Bulwinkle (D)
 . Zebulon Weaver (D)

North Dakota 
 . Olger B. Burtness (R)
 . Thomas Hall (R)
 . James H. Sinclair (R)

Ohio 
 . Nicholas Longworth (R), until April 9, 1931
 John B. Hollister (R), from November 3, 1931
 . William E. Hess (R)
 . Byron B. Harlan (D)
 . John L. Cable (R)
 . Frank C. Kniffin (D)
 . James G. Polk (D)
 . Charles Brand (R)
 . Grant E. Mouser Jr. (R)
 . Wilbur M. White (R)
 . Thomas A. Jenkins (R)
 . Mell G. Underwood (D)
 . Arthur P. Lamneck (D)
 . William L. Fiesinger (D)
 . Francis Seiberling (R)
 . C. Ellis Moore (R)
 . Charles B. McClintock (R)
 . Charles F. West (D)
 . B. Frank Murphy (R)
 . John G. Cooper (R)
 . Charles A. Mooney (D), until May 29, 1931
 Martin L. Sweeney (D), from November 3, 1931
 . Robert Crosser (D)
 . Chester C. Bolton (R)

Oklahoma 
 . Wesley E. Disney (D)
 . William W. Hastings (D)
 . Wilburn Cartwright (D)
 . Tom D. McKeown (D)
 . Fletcher B. Swank (D)
 . Jed Johnson (D)
 . James V. McClintic (D)
 . Milton C. Garber (R)

Oregon 
 . Willis C. Hawley (R)
 . Robert R. Butler (R), until January 7, 1933
 . Charles H. Martin (D)

Pennsylvania 
 . James M. Beck (R)
 . George S. Graham (R), until July 4, 1931
 Edward L. Stokes (R), from November 3, 1931
 . Harry C. Ransley (R)
 . Benjamin M. Golder (R)
 . James J. Connolly (R)
 . George A. Welsh (R), until May 31, 1932
 Robert L. Davis (R), from November 8, 1932
 . George P. Darrow (R)
 . James Wolfenden (R)
 . Henry W. Watson (R)
 . J. Roland Kinzer (R)
 . Patrick J. Boland (D)
 . C. Murray Turpin (R)
 . George F. Brumm (R)
 . Norton L. Lichtenwalner (D)
 . Louis T. McFadden (R)
 . Robert F. Rich (R)
 . Frederick W. Magrady (R)
 . Edward M. Beers (R), until April 21, 1932 (died)
 Joseph F. Biddle (R), from November 8, 1932
 . Isaac H. Doutrich (R)
 . James R. Leech (R), until January 29, 1932
 Howard W. Stull (R), from April 26, 1932
 . J. Banks Kurtz (R)
 . Harry L. Haines (D)
 . J. Mitchell Chase (R)
 . Samuel A. Kendall (R), until January 8, 1933
 . Henry W. Temple (R)
 . J. Howard Swick (R)
 . Nathan L. Strong (R)
 . Thomas C. Cochran (R)
 . Milton W. Shreve (R)
 . William R. Coyle (R)
 . Adam M. Wyant (R)
 . Edmund F. Erk (R)
 . M. Clyde Kelly (R)
 . Patrick J. Sullivan (R)
 . Harry A. Estep (R)
 . Guy E. Campbell (R)

Rhode Island 
 . Clark Burdick (R)
 . Richard S. Aldrich (R)
 . Francis Condon (D)

South Carolina 
 . Thomas S. McMillan (D)
 . Butler B. Hare (D)
 . Frederick H. Dominick (D)
 . John J. McSwain (D)
 . William F. Stevenson (D)
 . Allard H. Gasque (D)
 . Hampton P. Fulmer (D)

South Dakota 
 . Charles A. Christopherson (R)
 . Royal C. Johnson (R)
 . William Williamson (R)

Tennessee 
 . Oscar Lovette (R)
 . J. Will Taylor (R)
 . Sam D. McReynolds (D)
 . John R. Mitchell (D)
 . Ewin L. Davis (D)
 . Joseph W. Byrns Sr. (D)
 . Edward E. Eslick (D), until June 14, 1932
 Willa M. B. Eslick (D), from August 14, 1932
 . Gordon Browning (D)
 . Jere Cooper (D)
 . Edward H. Crump (D)

Texas 
 . Wright Patman (D)
 . Martin Dies Jr. (D)
 . Morgan G. Sanders (D)
 . Sam Rayburn (D)
 . Hatton W. Sumners (D)
 . Luther Alexander Johnson (D)
 . Clay Stone Briggs (D)
 . Daniel E. Garrett (D), until December 13, 1932
 Joe H. Eagle (D), from January 28, 1933
 . Joseph J. Mansfield (D)
 . James P. Buchanan (D)
 . Oliver H. Cross (D)
 . Fritz G. Lanham (D)
 . Guinn Williams (D)
 . Harry M. Wurzbach (R), until November 6, 1931
 Richard M. Kleberg (D), from November 24, 1931
 . John N. Garner (D)
 . R. Ewing Thomason (D)
 . Thomas L. Blanton (D)
 . J. Marvin Jones (D)

Utah 
 . Don B. Colton (R)
 . Frederick C. Loofbourow (R)

Vermont 
 . John E. Weeks (R)
 . Ernest Willard Gibson (R)

Virginia 
 . S. Otis Bland (D)
 . Menalcus Lankford (R)
 . Andrew J. Montague (D)
 . Patrick Henry Drewry (D)
 . Thomas G. Burch (D)
 . Clifton A. Woodrum (D)
 . John W. Fishburne (D)
 . Howard W. Smith (D)
 . John W. Flannagan Jr. (D)
 . Henry St. George Tucker III (D), until July 23, 1932
 Joel W. Flood (D), from November 8, 1932

Washington 
 . Ralph Horr (R)
 . Lindley H. Hadley (R)
 . Albert Johnson (R)
 . John W. Summers (R)
 . Samuel B. Hill (D)

West Virginia 
 . Carl G. Bachmann (R)
 . Frank L. Bowman (R)
 . Lynn Hornor (D)
 . Robert L. Hogg (R)
 . Hugh Ike Shott (R)
 . Joe L. Smith (D)

Wisconsin 
 . Thomas R. Amlie (R), from October 13, 1931
 . Charles A. Kading (R)
 . John M. Nelson (R)
 . John C. Schafer (R)
 . William H. Stafford (R)
 . Michael Reilly (D)
 . Gardner R. Withrow (R)
 . Gerald J. Boileau (R)
 . George J. Schneider (R)
 . James A. Frear (R)
 . Hubert H. Peavey (R)

Wyoming 
 . Vincent Carter (R)

Non-voting members 
 . James Wickersham (R)
 . Victor S. K. Houston (R)
 . Pedro Guevara (Nac.)
 . Camilo Osías (Nac.)
 . Félix Córdova Dávila, until April 11, 1932
 José Lorenzo Pesquera (Resident Commissioner) (I), from April 15, 1932

Changes in membership

Senate 
 Replacements: 11
 Democratic: 1-seat net loss
 Republican: no net change
 Deaths: 6
 Resignations: 1
 Interim appointments: 5
 Total seats with changes: 8

|-
| Vermont(1)
|  | Frank C. Partridge (R)
| Interim appointee lost nomination to finish the term.Successor elected March 31, 1931.
|  | Warren Austin (R)
| April 1, 1931

|-
| New Jersey(2)
|  | Dwight Morrow (R)
| Died October 5, 1931.Successor was appointed and later elected.
|  | William W. Barbour (R)
| December 1, 1931

|-
| Arkansas(3)
|  | Thaddeus H. Caraway (D)
| Died November 6, 1931.Successor was appointed to finish the term.
|  | Hattie Caraway (D)
| November 13, 1931

|-
| Georgia(2)
|  | William J. Harris (D)
| Died April 18, 1932.Successor was appointed to finish the term.
|  | John S. Cohen (D)
| April 25, 1932

|-
| Colorado(3)
|  | Charles W. Waterman (R)
| Died August 27, 1932.Successor was appointed to finish the term.
|  | Walter Walker (D)
| September 26, 1932

|-
| Washington(3)
|  | Wesley L. Jones (R)
| Died November 19, 1932.Successor was appointed to finish the term.
|  | Elijah S. Grammer (R)
| November 22, 1932

|-
| Colorado(3)
|  | Walter Walker (D)
| Interim appointee lost election to finish term.Successor elected November 8, 1932.
|  | Karl C. Schuyler (R)
| December 7, 1932

|-
| North Carolina(3)
|  | Cameron A. Morrison (D)
| Interim appointee lost election to finish term.Successor elected November 8, 1932.
|  | Robert R Reynolds (D)
| December 5, 1932

|-
| Georgia(2)
|  | John S. Cohen (D)
| Interim appointee lost election to finish term.Successor elected January 12, 1933.
|  | Richard Russell Jr. (D)
| January 12, 1933

|-
| Missouri(3)
|  | Harry B. Hawes (D)
| Incumbent retired and then resigned early February 3, 1933.Successor appointed having already been elected.
|  | Bennett Champ Clark (D)
| February 3, 1933

|-
| Montana(2)
|  | Thomas J. Walsh (D)
| Died March 2, 1933Seat remained vacant until next Congress
| colspan=2 | Vacant

|}

House of Representatives 
Replacements: 23
 Democratic: 6 seat net gain
 Republican: 6 seat net loss
Deaths: 24
Resignations: 7
Contested election: 1
Total seats with changes: 32

|-
| 
| Vacant
| Representative Henry A. Cooper (R) died in previous congress.
|  | Thomas R. Amlie (R)
| October 13, 1931

|-
| 
|  | James B. Aswell (D)
| Died March 16, 1931
|  | John H. Overton (D)
| May 12, 1931

|-
| 
|  | Nicholas Longworth (R)
| Died April 9, 1931
|  | John B. Hollister (R)
| November 3, 1931

|-
| 
|  | Matthew V. O'Malley (D)
| Died May 26, 1931. Because Congress was not in session at the time of his death, O'Malley never took his oath of office or exercised any of the duties of a Congressman. He was, nevertheless, serving in office from the beginning of his term on March 4, 1931.
|  | John J. Delaney (D)
| November 3, 1931

|-
| 
|  | Charles A. Mooney (D)
| Died May 29, 1931
|  | Martin L. Sweeney (D)
| November 3, 1931

|-
| 
|  | George S. Graham (R)
| Died July 4, 1931
|  | Edward L. Stokes (R)
| November 3, 1931

|-
| 
|  | Charles G. Edwards (D)
| Died July 13, 1931
|  | Homer C. Parker (D)
| September 9, 1931

|-
| 
|  | Bird J. Vincent (R)
| Died July 18, 1931
|  | Michael J. Hart (D)
| November 3, 1931

|-
| 
|  | Samuel C. Major (D)
| Died July 28, 1931
|  | Robert D. Johnson (D)
| September 29, 1931

|-
| 
|  | Ernest R. Ackerman (R)
| Died October 18, 1931
|  | Percy H. Stewart (D)
| December 1, 1931

|-
| 
|  | Fletcher Hale (R)
| Died October 22, 1931
|  | William N. Rogers (D)
| January 5, 1932

|-
| 
|  | Harry M. Wurzbach (R)
| Died November 6, 1931
|  | Richard M. Kleberg (D)
| November 24, 1931

|-
| 
|  | James R. Leech (R)
| Resigned January 29, 1932, to become a member of the United States Board of Tax Appeals
|  | Howard W. Stull (R)
| April 26, 1932

|-
| 
|  | Percy Quin (D)
| Died February 4, 1932
|  | Lawrence R. Ellzey (D)
| March 15, 1932

|-
| 
|  | Samuel Rutherford (D)
| Died February 4, 1932
|  | Carlton Mobley (D)
| March 2, 1932

|-
| 
|  | Albert H. Vestal (R)
| Died April 1, 1932
| colspan=2 | Seat remained vacant until next Congress.

|-
| 
|  | Peter C. Granata (R)
| Lost contested election April 5, 1932
|  | Stanley H. Kunz (D)
| April 5, 1932

|-
| 
| Félix Córdova Dávila
| resigned April 11, 1932, to become Associate Justice of the Supreme Court of Puerto Rico
| José Lorenzo Pesquera
| April 15, 1932

|-
| 
|  | Frederick W. Dallinger (R)
| Resigned October 1, 1932
| colspan=2 | Seat remained vacant until next Congress.

|-
| 
|  | Edward M. Beers (R)
| Died April 21, 1932
|  | Joseph F. Biddle (R)
| November 8, 1932

|-
| 
|  | George A. Welsh (R)
| Resigned May 31, 1932, to become judge for the United States District Court for the Eastern District of Pennsylvania
|  | Robert L. Davis (R)
| November 8, 1932

|-
| 
|  | Edward E. Eslick (D)
| Died June 14, 1932
|  | Willa McCord Blake Eslick (D)
| August 14, 1932

|-
| 
|  | Henry St. George Tucker III (D)
| Died July 23, 1932
|  | Joel W. Flood (D)
| November 8, 1932

|-
| 
|  | J. Charles Linthicum (D)
| Died October 5, 1932
|  | Ambrose J. Kennedy (D)
| November 8, 1932

|-
| 
|  | Charles R. Crisp (D)
| Resigned October 7, 1932, to become a member of the US Tariff Commission
|  | Bryant T. Castellow (D)
| November 8, 1932

|-
| 
|  | Charles A. Karch (D)
| Resigned November 6, 1932
| colspan=2 | Seat remained vacant until next Congress.

|-
| 
|  | James C. McLaughlin (R)
| Died November 29, 1932
| colspan=2 | Seat remained vacant until next Congress.

|-
| 
|  | John Q. Tilson (R)
| Resigned December 3, 1932
| colspan=2 | Seat remained vacant until next Congress.

|-
| 
|  | Daniel E. Garrett (D)
| Died December 13, 1932
|  | Joe H. Eagle (D)
| January 28, 1933

|-
| 
|  | Robert R. Butler (R)
| Died January 7, 1933
| colspan=2 | Seat remained vacant until next Congress.

|-
| 
|  | Samuel A. Kendall (R)
| Died January 8, 1933
| colspan=2 | Seat remained vacant until next Congress.

|-
| 
|  | Godfrey G. Goodwin (R)
| Died February 16, 1933
| colspan=2 | Seat remained vacant until next Congress.

|}

Committees

Senate

 Agriculture and Forestry (Chairman: Charles L. McNary; Ranking Member: Ellison D. Smith)
 Air Mail and Ocean Mail Contracts (Special)
 Alaska Railroad (Special Select)
 Appropriations (Chairman: Wesley L. Jones; Ranking Member: William J. Harris)
 Audit and Control the Contingent Expenses of the Senate (Chairman: John G. Townsend Jr.; Ranking Member: John B. Kendrick)
 Banking and Currency (Chairman: Peter Norbeck; Ranking Member: Duncan U. Fletcher)
 Civil Service (Chairman: Porter H. Dale; Ranking Member: Kenneth McKellar)
 Claims (Chairman: Robert B. Howell; Ranking Member: Park Trammell)
 Commerce (Chairman: Hiram W. Johnson; Ranking Member: Duncan U. Fletcher)
 Depreciation of Foreign Currencies (Select)
 District of Columbia (Chairman: Arthur Capper; Ranking Member: William H. King)
 Education and Labor (Chairman: Jesse H. Metcalf; Ranking Member: Royal S. Copeland)
 Enrolled Bills (Chairman: Frank L. Greene; Ranking Member: Coleman L. Blease)
 Expenditures in Executive Departments (Chairman: Frederick M. Sackett then Guy D. Goff; Ranking Member: Claude A. Swanson)
 Finance (Chairman: Reed Smoot; Ranking Member: Furnifold M. Simmons)
 Foreign Relations (Chairman: William E. Borah; Ranking Member: Claude A. Swanson)
 Immigration (Chairman: Arthur R. Gould; Ranking Member: William H. King)
 Indian Affairs (Chairman: Lynn J. Frazier; Ranking Member: Henry F. Ashurst)
 Interoceanic Canals (Chairman: Thomas D. Schall; Ranking Member: Thomas J. Walsh)
 Interstate Commerce (Chairman: James Couzens; Ranking Member: Ellison D. Smith)
 Irrigation and Reclamation (Chairman: John Thomas; Ranking Member: Morris Sheppard)
 Judiciary (Chairman: George W. Norris; Ranking Member: Lee S. Overman then Henry F. Ashurst)
 Library (Chairman: Simeon D. Fess; Ranking Member: Kenneth McKellar)
 Manufactures (Chairman: Robert M. La Follette Jr.; Ranking Member: Ellison D. Smith)
 Military Affairs (Chairman: David A. Reed; Ranking Member: Duncan U. Fletcher)
 Mines and Mining (Chairman: Roscoe C. Patterson; Ranking Member: Thomas J. Walsh)
 Mississippi Flood Control Project (Select)
 Naval Affairs (Chairman: Frederick Hale; Ranking Member: Claude A. Swanson)
 Patents (Chairman: Charles W. Waterman; Ranking Member: Ellison D. Smith)
 Pensions (Chairman: Arthur R. Robinson; Ranking Member: Burton K. Wheeler)
 Post Office Leases (Select) 
 Post Office and Post Roads (Chairman: Lawrence C. Phipps; Ranking Member: Kenneth McKellar)
 Printing (Chairman: George H. Moses; Ranking Member: Duncan U. Fletcher)
 Privileges and Elections (Chairman: Samuel M. Shortridge; Ranking Member: William H. King)
 Public Buildings and Grounds (Chairman: Henry W. Keyes; Ranking Member: Duncan U. Fletcher)
 Public Lands and Surveys (Chairman: Gerald P. Nye; Ranking Member: Key Pittman)
 Reconstruction Finance Corporation (Select)
 Rules (Chairman: George H. Moses; Ranking Member: Lee S. Overman then Pat Harrison)
 Territories and Insular Affairs (Chairman: Hiram Bingham; Ranking Member: Key Pittman) 
 Whole

House of Representatives

 Accounts (Chairman: Charles L. Underhill; Ranking Member: Lindsay C. Warren)
 Agriculture (Chairman: Gilbert N. Haugen; Ranking Member: James B. Aswell)
 Appropriations (Chairman: William R. Wood; Ranking Member: Joseph W. Byrns)
 Banking and Currency (Chairman: Louis T. McFadden; Ranking Member: Otis Wingo then John E. Rankin)
 Census (Chairman: E. Hart Fenn; Ranking Member: John E. Rankin)
 Civil Service (Chairman: Frederick R. Lehlbach; Ranking Member: Lamar Jeffers)
 Claims (Chairman: Edward M. Irwin; Ranking Member: John C. Box)
 Coinage, Weights and Measures (Chairman: Randolph Perkins; Ranking Member: Edgar Howard)
 Disposition of Executive Papers (Chairman: Edward H. Wason; Ranking Member: Robert A. Green)
 District of Columbia (Chairman: Frederick N. Zihlman; Ranking Member: Christopher D. Sullivan)
 Education (Chairman: Daniel A. Reed; Ranking Member: Loring M. Black)
 Election of the President, Vice President and Representatives in Congress (Chairman: Charles L. Gifford; Ranking Member: Lamar Jeffers)
 Elections No.#1 (Chairman: Carroll L. Beedy; Ranking Member: Edward E. Eslick)
 Elections No.#2 (Chairman: Bird J. Vincent; Ranking Member: John J. Douglass)
 Elections No.#3 (Chairman: Willis G. Sears; Ranking Member: John H. Kerr)
 Enrolled Bills (Chairman: Guy E. Campbell; Ranking Member: Mell G. Underwood)
 Expenditures in the Executive Departments (Chairman: William Williamson; Ranking Member: Allard H. Gasque)
 Flood Control (Chairman: Frank R. Reid; Ranking Member: Riley J. Wilson)
 Foreign Affairs (Chairman: Stephen G. Porter; Ranking Member: J. Charles Linthicum)
 Immigration and Naturalization (Chairman: Albert Johnson; Ranking Member: John C. Box)
 Indian Affairs (Chairman: Scott Leavitt; Ranking Member: John M. Evans)
 Insular Affairs (Chairman: Edgar R. Kiess; Ranking Member: Christopher D. Sullivan)
 Interstate and Foreign Commerce (Chairman: James S. Parker; Ranking Member: Sam Rayburn)
 Invalid Pensions (Chairman: John M. Nelson; Ranking Member: Mell G. Underwood)
 Irrigation and Reclamation (Chairman: Addison T. Smith; Ranking Member: C. B. Hudspeth)
 Judiciary (Chairman: George S. Graham; Ranking Member: Hatton W. Sumners) 
 Labor (Chairman: William F. Kopp; Ranking Member: William P. Connery Jr.)
 Library (Chairman: Robert Luce; Ranking Member: Lindsay C. Warren)
 Memorials (Chairman: Burton L. French; Ranking Member: N/A)
 Merchant Marine and Fisheries (Chairman: Wallace H. White Jr.; Ranking Member: Ewin L. Davis)
 Military Affairs (Chairman: W. Frank James; Ranking Member: Percy E. Quin)
 Mines and Mining (Chairman: William H. Sproul; Ranking Member: Arthur H. Greenwood)
 Naval Affairs (Chairman: Frederick A. Britten; Ranking Member: Carl Vinson)
 Patents (Chairman: Albert H. Vestal; Ranking Member: Fritz G. Lanham)
 Pensions (Chairman: Harold Knutson; Ranking Member: Allard H. Gasque)
 Post Office and Post Roads (Chairman: Archie D. Sanders; Ranking Member: Thomas M. Bell)
 Printing (Chairman: Edward M. Beers; Ranking Member: William F. Stevenson)
 Public Buildings and Grounds (Chairman: Richard N. Elliott; Ranking Member: Fritz G. Lanham)
 Public Lands (Chairman: Don B. Colton; Ranking Member: John M. Evans)
 Revision of Laws (Chairman: Roy G. Fitzgerald; Ranking Member: Loring M. Black)
 Rivers and Harbors (Chairman: S. Wallace Dempsey; Ranking Member: Joseph J. Mansfield)
 Roads (Chairman: Cassius C. Dowell; Ranking Member: Edward B. Almon)
 Rules (Chairman: Bertrand H. Snell; Ranking Member: Edward W. Pou)
 Standards of Official Conduct
 Territories (Chairman: Charles F. Curry; Ranking Member: William C. Lankford)
 War Claims (Chairman: James G. Strong; Ranking Member: Miles C. Allgood)
 Ways and Means (Chairman: Willis C. Hawley; Ranking Member: John N. Garner)
 World War Veterans' Legislation (Chairman: Royal C. Johnson; Ranking Member: John E. Rankin)
 Whole

Joint committees

 Conditions of Indian Tribes (Special)
 Disposition of (Useless) Executive Papers
 The Library (Chairman: Sen. Simeon D. Fess)
 Printing (Chairman: Sen. George H. Moses then Duncan U. Fletcher; Vice Chairman: Rep. Edgar R. Kiess)
 Taxation (Chairman: Rep. Willis C. Hawley)
 Veterans' Affairs

Caucuses
 Democratic (House)
 Democratic (Senate)

Employees

Legislative branch agency directors 
Architect of the Capitol: David Lynn
Attending Physician of the United States Congress: George Calver
Comptroller General of the United States: John R. McCarl
Librarian of Congress: Herbert Putnam 
Public Printer of the United States: George H. Carter

Senate 
Chaplain: ZeBarney T. Phillips (Episcopalian)
Secretary: Edwin P. Thayer
Librarian: James D. Preston
Sergeant at Arms: David S. Barry
Democratic Party Secretary: Edwin A. Halsey
Republican Party Secretary: Carl A. Loeffler

House of Representatives 
Chaplain: James S. Montgomery (Methodist)
Clerk: South Trimble
Doorkeeper: Joseph J. Sinnott
Parliamentarian: Lewis Deschler
Postmaster: Finis E. Scott
Reading Clerks: Patrick Joseph Haltigan (D) and Alney E. Chaffee (R)
Sergeant at Arms: Joseph G. Rodgers, until December 7, 1931
 Kenneth Romney, from December 7, 1931

See also 
 1930 United States elections (elections leading to this Congress)
 1930 United States Senate elections
 1930 United States House of Representatives elections
 1932 United States elections (elections during this Congress, leading to the next Congress)
 1932 United States presidential election
 1932 United States Senate elections
 1932 United States House of Representatives elections

Notes

References

External links 
Biographical Directory of the U.S. Congress
U.S. House of Representatives: House History
U.S. Senate: Statistics and Lists